Jean-Antoine Rioux (1925-2017) was a French parasitologist, mainly a specialist of leishmaniasis. He coined the term ecoepidemiology for a discipline combining concepts of ecology and epidemiology to understand parasite transmission patterns and processes. He was a professor at the University of Montpellier, France, and one of the founders of the Société Française de Parasitologie in 1962.

Scientific career 

Jean-Antoine Rioux worked on several parasitological diseases, including malaria, plague, schistosomiasis, and leishmaniasis. He led teams in the field in France (Camargue, Languedoc, Roussillon, Cévennes, Corsica), and various countries including Iran, Chad,  Tunisia, and Morocco.

Taxa named in his honour 

Many taxa were named in the honour of Jean-Antoine Rioux by his colleagues. The list of species includes: Adelina riouxi Levine, 1977 (Coccidia, Adeleidae), Amphinomia riouxii Quézel, 1959 (Rosales, Leguminosae),  Culicoides riouxi Callot & Krémer, 1961 (Diptera, Ceratopogonidae),  Empidomermis riouxi Doucet, Laumont & Bain, 1979 (Nematoda, Mermithidae), Hystrichopsylla talpae riouxi Beaucournu & Rosin, 1977 (Siphonaptera, Hystrichopsyllidae), Longicollum riouxi Golvan, 1969 (Acanthocephala, Pomphorhynchidae), Phlebotomus (Paraphlebotomus) riouxi Depaquit, Léger & Killick-Kendrick, 1998 (Diptera, Psychodidae), Pseudorhabdosynochus riouxi (Oliver, 1986) Kritsky & Beverley-Burton, 1986 (Monogenea, Diplectanidae). The genus  Riouxgolvania Bain & Brunhes, 1968 (Nematoda, Muspiceidae) honours both Jean-Antoine Rioux and Yves-Jean Golvan, two French parasitologists. The subgenus Riouxomyia Depaquit, Blavier & Randrianambinintsoa, 2019 has been created for sandflies (Diptera, Phlebotominae).

Scientific collection
Jean-Antoine Rioux collected un impressive number of specimens, mainly phlebotomes, during his career. His collection includes more than 130,000 specimens coming from 10 countries: France, Italy, Spain, Algeria, Tunisia, Morocco, Yemen, Syria, Sudan,and Republic of Congo. The collection is now curated by the University of Reims Champagne-Ardenne in France.

Selected publications
The most cited paper by Jean-Antoine Rioux is his classification of Leishmania in 1990.

External links
 Société Française de Parasitologie

References

1925 births
2017 deaths
Academic staff of the University of Montpellier
French microbiologists
French entomologists
French parasitologists
Recipients of the Legion of Honour
Recipients of the Order of Agricultural Merit
Recipients of the Ordre national du Mérite